Nonlocal may refer to:

 Action at a distance, direct interaction of physical objects that are not in proximity
 Conjugated system (or nonlocalized bond), in chemistry, a conjugated system is a system of connected p-orbitals with delocalized electrons in compounds with alternating single and multiple bonds, which in general may lower the overall energy of the molecule and increase stability
 Nonlocal goto, an abstract representation of the control state of a computer program
 Nonlocal Lagrangian, in field theory, a type of functional  which contains terms which are nonlocal in the fields i.e. which are not polynomials or functions of the fields or their derivatives evaluated at a single point in the space of dynamical parameters (e.g. space-time)
 Other nonlocal relationships in physics, such as Pippard's nonlocal generalisation of the Londons' equations for superconductivity
 Non-local means, an algorithm in image processing for image denoising
 Non-local variable, in programming language theory, a variable that is not defined in the local scope
 nonlocal, a statement in Python 3 that causes identifiers to refer to their bindings in outer enclosing scopes

See also
 Nonlocality (disambiguation)